The 2007–08 Danish Cup was the 54th version of the Danish Cup. The first round were played about August 7 and the final was played on May 1.

The winner qualified for the UEFA Cup.

Fixtures and results
The team listed to the left, is the home team.

First round
In the first round  54 teams from the "series" (Denmark's series and lower 2007), 22 teams from Danish 2nd Divisions 2006-07 and 12 teams from Danish 1st Division 2006-07 (no. 5 to 16) competed.

Second round
In second round competed 44 winning teams from first round, 4 teams from Danish 1st Division 2006-07 (no. 1 to 4) and 8 teams from Danish Superliga 2006-07 (no. 5 to 12).

The draw were held on August 10, 2006.

Third round
In third round compete 28 winning teams from second round and 4 teams from Danish Superliga 2006-07 (no. 1 to 4).

Fourth round

Quarter finals

Semi finals
The semi finals were played on a home and away basis.

Final

See also
 Football in Denmark
 2007-08 in Danish football
 Danish Superliga 2007-08
 Danish 1st Division 2007-08
 Danish 2nd Divisions 2007-08 - East, West

External links

Denmark
Cup
2008